Herbert Brown Maw (March 11, 1893 – November 17, 1990) was an American politician and educator who was the eighth Governor of Utah. He served as governor from 1941 to 1949. He was a Democrat and was a member of the Church of Jesus Christ of Latter-day Saints (LDS Church).

Early life
Maw was born in Ogden in the Utah Territory. When he was seven his family moved to Salt Lake City. He studied at LDS High School as a youth.

Education

Maw received his bachelor of laws and bachelor of science degrees from the University of Utah, an MA from Northwestern University in 1926 and a Juris Doctor degree also from Northwestern in 1927. While in school at the University of Utah, he joined the Sigma Chi fraternity and became a member of the inaugural pledge class initiated to the Beta Epsilon chapter.

Military
Maw was trained as a pilot by the Aviation Corps during World War I at Kelley Air Base in Texas. Before he was deployed in this service he was made an LDS Chaplain with the rank of First Lieutenant and assigned to work with the 89th Division at Camp Funston, Kansas. He was then sent to Europe and after the end of the war served in the Army of Occupation in Germany. Maw was one of only three LDS chaplains in the US military during World War I.

Early career
Maw taught at LDS Business College from 1916 to 1917 and from 1919 to 1923. He was a professor of speech at the University of Utah from 1927 until 1940. Maw served as Dean of Men at the University of Utah from 1928 until 1936. Maw was influential on the development of the University of Utah and its future course.

Political career
Maw was elected to the Utah State Senate in 1928 where he served until 1938. Maw served as the President of the Utah State Senate from 1934 until 1938. He was an unsuccessful candidate for the Democratic nomination for the US Senate in 1934 and Governor in 1936. His loss was partly a result of his strong support of measures to help workers. Maw's winning the Democratic nomination in 1940 was largely the result of his successful push for direct primaries.

Maw was first elected governor of Utah in 1940, defeating Republican Don B. Colton. While serving as governor Maw pushed through reductions in the utility rates and regulations on ore extraction in the state.

In 1944 Maw was narrowly re-elected over Republican J. Bracken Lee in the closest gubernatorial election in Utah history. In 1948 Maw lost to Lee in a re-match. In this election Maw was a clear and consistent opponent of liberalizing Utah's drinking laws.

Religious life
Maw held many positions in the LDS Church. He was a Sunday School teacher in both Salt Lake City and Chicago. He also taught in the Young Men's Mutual Improvement Association (YMMIA) and was a ward and stake leader of that organization. In 1928 and 1929, he was the Superintendent of the Liberty Stake Sunday School, during which years he was also a member of the stake high council. From 1928 to 1935, Maw was a member of the general board of the YMMIA. In December 1935, Maw became a member of the Deseret Sunday School Union General Board.

Family
Maw married Florence Buehler on June 22, 1922. They had five children.

References

|-

|-

1893 births
1990 deaths
20th-century American politicians
20th-century Mormon missionaries
American leaders of the Church of Jesus Christ of Latter-day Saints
United States Army chaplains
United States Army personnel of World War I
American Mormon missionaries in the United States
Burials at Salt Lake City Cemetery
Democratic Party governors of Utah
Ensign College faculty
Mission presidents (LDS Church)
Northwestern University Pritzker School of Law alumni
Sunday School (LDS Church) people
University of Utah alumni
University of Utah faculty
Utah lawyers
Democratic Party Utah state senators
Young Men (organization) people
World War I chaplains
Latter Day Saints from Utah
Latter Day Saints from Illinois
20th-century American lawyers
20th-century American clergy
S.J. Quinney College of Law alumni